Hamilton Gorges may refer to:

 Hamilton Gorges (1711–1786), Anglo-Irish MP
 Hamilton Gorges (1737–1802), Anglo-Irish MP